Modsec (officially San Fernando Central Secondary School since 2009) is a government run co-educational secondary school in San Fernando, Trinidad and Tobago. It has also been known as San Fernando Modern Secondary School (1962) (hence "Modsec"), and San Fernando Government Secondary School (1966). It was founded on the Les Efforts pond (previously owned by the sugar-cane estate) and is located at 40 Todd Street in San Fernando, Trinidad. The school was officially opened in September, 1961 but classes did not commence until 19 February 1962. In 1962 the school population was 106 students; in 2011 (49 years later) the school population (comprising a melting pot of ethnicities and creeds) is almost 800 students.

Principals
The following is a chronological list of principals who have served at Modsec.

Notable alumni 
Roodal Moonilal, former Senator and former Minister of Housing and the Environment and Leader of the House
Buzz Johnson, publisher of Karia Press

Gallery

References

External links 
 
Modsec listed at the Ministry of Education, T&T
Modsec listed at the San Fernando City Corporation

Educational institutions established in 1962
Secondary schools in Trinidad and Tobago